(born June 28, 1974 in Kamakura, Kanagawa Prefecture, Japan) is a Japanese-American singer. Due to her upbringing, she is bilingual and has performed in both English and (more commonly) Japanese. She attended Berklee College of Music in Boston, Massachusetts, USA. She is a member of Reggae Disco Rockers and has a solo career.  She sang both the opening and ending theme songs of Infinite Ryvius, the ending theme for The Twelve Kingdoms and the ending theme songs of Phantasy Star Online 2, "Living on like stars" and "Crying Your Phantasy", from EPISODE 2 and EPISODE 6's normal ending, respectively. With her career taking off, more chances to showcase her singing finally came.

She is the vocalist for the second ending theme for Mobile Suit Gundam SEED Destiny, "Life Goes On". This song was ranked top in Oricon daily single chart on first day of its release, and later ranked fourth in Oricon weekly single chart that same first week.

She was featured on Jazztronik's album called GRAND BLUE on the track "Sanctuary" that came out in June 2007 from Pony Canyon Records, Japan.

References

External links
 有坂　美香 
 Reggae Disco Rockers Official Web Site 
 Traveling Water – 楽天ブログ（Blog） 
 
 
有坂美香
Reggae Disco Rockers on MySpace Music
Kawasaki, Naoko. "Mika Arisaka packs her seven-year career into TV Song Book 1999–2006". (January 2007) Newtype USA. p. 121.

Japanese women musicians
Japanese musicians
Berklee College of Music alumni
Living people
People from Kamakura
American women musicians of Japanese descent
1974 births
Japanese emigrants to the United States
American musicians of Japanese descent
Musicians from Kanagawa Prefecture
Anime musicians
21st-century American women musicians